Urum may refer to:

 Urum (Babylonia), an ancient city
 Urum people, several groups of Turkic-speaking Greeks in the Crimea and Georgia
 Urum language
 Urum al-Jawz, a village in Idlib Governorate in northern Syria
 Urum al-Kubra, a town in Aleppo Governorate in northern Syria
 Urum al-Kubrah Subdistrict
 Urum al-Sughra, a village in Aleppo Governorate in northern Syria
 A Mongolian clotted cream often eaten on bread with sugar
 An Old English pronoun 

Language and nationality disambiguation pages